Jon Zens is an American author, speaker, scholar and theologian on Christian topics. Zens is best known for pioneering New Covenant Theology. Zens is also an expert on the Anabaptist history and theology.

Early life and education
Zens holds a B.A. in Biblical studies from Covenant College, a M.Div. from Westminster Theological Seminary, Philadelphia, and a D.Min. from the California Graduate School of Theology.

Career
In 1975, Zens moved to Nashville to work with Norbert Ward on the publication Baptist Reformation Review. Because of declining health, Norbert asked Zens to be the editor in 1978. In 1982, the name of the quarterly was changed to  Searching Together.
The quarterly magazine features articles by Zens and many other writers on topics of divergent evangelicalism.

Zens and his wife Dotty have ministered to women who have been trafficked into the sex trade, aiding women who have been the victims of sexual abuse and involved in prostitution.
Zens served for a time as a local pastor, but left the position. becoming an author and a traveling speaker, ministering in church conferences and speaking at conferences about the rescue of women from the sex industry and prostitution.

Bibliography

What's With Paul & Women: Unlocking the Cultural Background to 1 Timothy 2
The Pastor Has No Clothes: Moving from Clergy-Centered Church to Christ-Centered Ekklesia
No Will of My Own: How Patriarchy Smothers Female Dignity & Personhood
A Church Building Every 1/2 Mile: What Makes American Christianity Tick?
Christ Minimized? A Response to Rob Bell's Love Wins
58-0: How Christ Leads Through the One Anothers

References

External links
Searching Together
Jon Zens Website
Jon Zens on Twitter
Jon Zens Biography

Year of birth missing (living people)
Living people
American Christian writers
American Christian theologians
American Protestants
Anti-prostitution activists in the United States